Lystra lanata is a planthopper species in the genus Lystra. Originally described by Carl Linnaeus by its basionym Cicada lanata.

Description 
Lystra lanata has black wings with blue spots and red sides to its head.

Range 
This species is found in Brazil, French Guiana, French West Indies, Guyana, México and Suriname.

Host 
A host plant of this species is the tree Simarouba amara. L. lanata was witnessed gathering in a group on this tree at a locality near where the Napo and Yagua rivers join.

References

Taxa named by Carl Linnaeus
Fauna of Brazil
Fauna of Suriname
Fauna of Guyana
Fauna of Ecuador
Fauna of Peru
Fauna of Bolivia
Fauna of French Guiana
Fauna of Venezuela
Poiocerinae